De ortu et progressu morum, or De ortu et progressu morum atque opinionum ad more pertinentium (About the origin and progress of customs and of opinions about customs), is an essay written in 1740 by Jacopo Stellini. Cesare Beccaria liked it very much.

References
Bartolommeo Gamba, Galleria Dei Letterati Ed Artisti Illustri Delle Provincie Veneziane Nel Secolo Decimottavo, Nabu Press, 2011,

External links
Essay's original and Italian versions
www.friul.net

Philosophy essays
1740 books
18th-century Latin books